Goëngahuizen is a hamlet in Smallingerland in the province of Friesland, the Netherlands. It had a population of around 58 in January 2017.

The village was first mentioned in 1573 as Gonyehuisen, and means "settlement of the Goinga family". Goëngahuizen is an isolated farmers community. Some peat excavation had taken place in the south of Goëngahuizen. It has its own place name signs.

Windmills
There are three windmills in Goëngahuizen, De Jansmolen, De Modderige Bol and Heechheim.

Gallery

References

External links

Populated places in Friesland
Smallingerland